Martin Kavdanski (born 13 February 1987) is a Bulgarian professional footballer who plays as a defender for Botev Vratsa.

Club career
On 28 June 2015, Kavdanski signed a one-year contract with the most successful club in Albania, KF Tirana, taking the number 3 for the 2015–16 season. He became the third defender that was brought to Tirana during that summer, after Dritan Smajli and Ronald Gërçaliu.

Kavdanski made his official debut with Tirana on 1 November in the match against Kukësi, featuring in the last 30 minutes of the 2–1 home win. Six days later he played only four minutes in another home win, this time against the newcomers of Tërbuni Pukë.

Kavdanski started for the first time this season on 23 November in the match against Bylis Ballsh, helping the team to get a clean-sheet in a 0–1 away win. During the first part of the season he struggled to find minutes, but found it very hard, as he was not the among the first choices of coach Ilir Daja, who preferred the duo Muça-Karan instead. He appeared in only six matches in the league and the cup, and eventually left the team on 25 December 2015.

Kavdanski spent the 2016–17 season at Lokomotiv Gorna Oryahovitsa; he left the club after his contract expired in June 2017.

In July 2017, Kavdanski joined Clermont Foot. In July 2020, he tested positive for COVID-19. In June 2022 Kavdanski returned to Botev Vratsa.

References

External links
 

1987 births
Living people
People from Dupnitsa
Bulgarian footballers
Association football defenders
FC Metz players
PFC Slavia Sofia players
PFC Lokomotiv Mezdra players
PFC Lokomotiv Plovdiv players
PFC Beroe Stara Zagora players
PFC Chernomorets Burgas players
KF Shkëndija players
PFC Marek Dupnitsa players
KF Tirana players
FC Lokomotiv Gorna Oryahovitsa players
Clermont Foot players
FC Botev Vratsa players
FC Tsarsko Selo Sofia players
First Professional Football League (Bulgaria) players
Kategoria Superiore players
Ligue 2 players
Bulgarian expatriate footballers
Expatriate footballers in France
Bulgarian expatriate sportspeople in France
Expatriate footballers in North Macedonia
Expatriate footballers in Albania
Bulgarian expatriate sportspeople in Albania
Bulgarian expatriate sportspeople in North Macedonia
Sportspeople from Kyustendil Province